The Xenopsyllinae form a flea subfamily (or depending on classifications a tribe called Xenopsyllini) in the family Pulicidae.

References

External links

Insect subfamilies
Pulicidae